The ADI Condor was a motor glider of unusual configuration built in the United States in 1981. While most motor gliders follow traditional sailplane layout, the Condor was of twin-boom configuration, with twin, inwardly canted tail fins joined at their tips by a common horizontal stabilizer. A pusher propeller driven by a converted Volkswagen engine was mounted at the rear of the central nacelle that seated the pilot and passenger in tandem. Construction throughout was of composite materials.

The single example of the aircraft was destroyed in a crash in late 1982 after an engine failure.

Specifications

References
 Manufacturer's website, with photo
 aerofiles.com

External links
 NTSB report on accident

1980s United States sailplanes
Motor gliders
Single-engined pusher aircraft
Twin-boom aircraft
Condor
Aircraft first flown in 1981